Tetracona amathealis is a snout moth in the subfamily Spilomelinae of the family Crambidae. It was described by Francis Walker in 1859 based on material collected at Moreton Bay in Queensland, Australia. It is found in New Guinea and Australia, where it has been recorded in Queensland, northern New South Wales and Western Australia. The species was formerly placed in the genus Agrotera, but in a recent taxonomic revision it was transferred back to the re-instated genus Tetracona, of which it is the type species.

The wingspan is about 20 mm. The basal half of the forewings is golden and the marginal half grey. These two areas are divided by an orange submarginal band. The hindwings are grey with a gold inner margin.

The caterpillars feed on Eucalyptus tereticornis, a plant of economic interest, which is why T. amathealis is sometimes considered a pest species.

References

Moths described in 1859
Spilomelinae
Moths of New Guinea
Moths of Australia